Lee In-ho (born 19 May 1936) is a South Korean historian specializing in Russian history and a professor emeritus of Seoul National University. She is a former South Korean ambassador to Finland and Russia, and South Korea's first female ambassador, appointed in 1996.

Lee was born and raised in Seoul, and studied at Seoul National University before moving to the United States in 1956. She received a B.A. in history from Wellesley College, an A.M. from Radcliffe College, and a PhD in history from Harvard University.

References

1936 births
Living people
People from Seoul
Wellesley College alumni
Radcliffe College alumni
Harvard University alumni
Academic staff of Korea University
Academic staff of Seoul National University
South Korean historians
Historians of Russia
South Korean women historians
South Korean women academics
Ambassadors of South Korea to Finland
Ambassadors of South Korea to Russia
South Korean women ambassadors